SM U-61 was a German Type U 57 U-boat commissioned and deployed to operate off the coast of the British Isles and attack coastal shipping as part of the U-boat Campaign during World War I.

In a 15-month career spanning nine war patrols, U-61 plagued allied shipping in the Atlantic Ocean during the German war on Allied trade (Handelskrieg). She sank 33 Allied ships, totalling . She went missing some time after March 23, 1918.

Summary of raiding history

References

Notes

Citations

Bibliography

World War I submarines of Germany
Type U 57 submarines
Ships built in Bremen (state)
1916 ships
U-boats commissioned in 1916
Maritime incidents in 1918
U-boats sunk in 1918
U-boats sunk by unknown causes
World War I shipwrecks in the Atlantic Ocean